The Juggler or The Jugglers may refer to:

 Juggling
 The Juggler, a book by Michael Blankfort
 The Juggler (film), a 1953 film based on the book
 "The Juggler" (1977), a song by Weather Report from the album Heavy Weather
 The Juggler (demo) (1986), an early Amiga computer demo

See also
 The Juggler of Notre Dame (disambiguation), the English translation of the title of several works